The 1978 Talladega 500 was a NASCAR Winston Cup Series racing event that took place on August 6, 1978, at Alabama International Motor Speedway in Talladega, Alabama.

Background
Talladega Superspeedway, originally known as Alabama International Motor Superspeedway (AIMS), is a motorsports complex located north of Talladega, Alabama. It is located on the former Anniston Air Force Base in the small city of Lincoln. The track is a Tri-oval and was constructed by International Speedway Corporation, a business controlled by the France Family, in the 1960s. Talladega is most known for its steep banking and the unique location of the start/finish line - located just past the exit to pit road. The track currently hosts the NASCAR series such as the Sprint Cup Series, Xfinity Series, and the Camping World Truck Series.

Race report
Four cautions were waved for seventeen laps; making the race last almost three hours in length, 67 lead changes the race. James Hylton finished last due to a transmission issue on the first lap of this 188-lap race. Lennie Pond became the third driver whose only career victory was at the summer Talladega race (Richard Brickhouse in 1969 and Dick Brooks in 1973). He would defeat Donnie Allison by two car lengths in front of 60,000 spectators. Yarborough lost half a lap near the end of the race, losing the leaders because he missed the pit entry and made his stop on lap 181.

There was one foreigner in the 41-car lineup: Claude Ballot-Léna from Paris, France. It was a 500 mile world's record in 1978. Female driver Janet Guthrie was also a part of the grid; finishing in 29th place due to a crash on lap 129. Country music star and part-time NASCAR driver Marty Robbins made his only start of the season and came home in the top-20 driving his Dodge Magnum.

Richard Petty would stop racing in Chrysler cars after this race. Only the 1984 Winston 500 would see more lead changes than this event.

Qualifying

Finishing order
Section reference: 

 Lennie Pond
 Donnie Allison
 Benny Parsons
 Cale Yarborough
 David Pearson
 Bobby Allison
 Richard Petty
 Neil Bonnett
 Dick Brooks
 Tighe Scott
 Ferrell Harris
 Dale Earnhardt
 Bill Elliott
 Dave Marcis
 Buddy Arrington
 Dick May
 J.D. McDuffie
 Marty Robbins
 D.K. Ulrich
 Tommy Gale
 Gary Myers
 Grant Adcox
 Baxter Price
 Ronnie Thomas
 Richard Childress
 Coo Coo Marlin
 Steve Moore
 Buddy Baker
 Janet Guthrie
 Al Holbert
 Earle Canavan
 Jimmy Means
 Frank Warren
 Darrell Waltrip
 Bruce Hill
 Roger Hamby
 Claude Ballot-Lena
 Skip Manning
 Ricky Rudd
 Blackie Wangerin
 James Hylton

Timeline
Section reference: 
 Start: Cale Yarborough was leading the starting grid as the cars were approaching the start/finish line.
 Lap 9: Blackie Wangerin had some engine issues that forced him out of the event.
 Lap 22: Ricky Rudd had some engine issues that forced him out of the event.
 Lap 46: Skip Manning had some engine issues that forced him out of the event.
 Lap 48: Claude Ballot-Lena had some engine issues that forced him out of the event.
 Lap 94: Roger Hamby's vehicle had a clutch that went bad which caused him to exit the race.
 Lap 96: The axle on Bruce Hill's vehicle became unsafe for further racing.
 Lap 105: Darrell Waltrip had some engine issues that forced him out of the event.
 Lap 118: Jimmy Means had a terminal crash.
 Lap 124: Al Holbert had some engine issues that forced him out of the event.
 Lap 129: Janet Guthrie had a terminal crash.
 Lap 149: Buddy Baker had some engine issues that forced him out of the event.
 Lap 158: Coo Coo Marlin had some engine issues that forced him out of the event.
 Finish: Lennie Pond was officially declared the winner of the event.

Standings after the race

References

Talladega 500
Talladega 500
NASCAR races at Talladega Superspeedway